Magdalena Feistel (born Magdalena Mróz 22 August 1970) is a former Polish tennis player.
She holds the record for most Fed Cup ties played for Poland (24; 43 matches) and most Fed Cup wins for Poland (23).

In her career, she won one singles title and 11 doubles titles on tournaments of the ITF Circuit.
Feistel's career-high singles ranking is world No. 192 (reached in February 1994), and her best doubles ranking, achieved in June 1994, is 91.

ITF Circuit finals

Singles: 4 (1–3)

Doubles: 20 (11–9)

External links
 
 
 

1970 births
Living people
Polish female tennis players
Sportspeople from Gdynia
Universiade medalists in tennis
Universiade silver medalists for Poland
Medalists at the 1997 Summer Universiade
20th-century Polish women
21st-century Polish women